Gracious Revenge is a 2019 South Korean television series starring Choi Myung-gil, Cha Ye-ryun, Kim Heung-soo, and Oh Chae-Yi.  It is airs on KBS2 every weekday at 19:50 (KST) time slot starting November 4, 2019.

Synopsis
A story of a woman who was raised as a tool for her mother's revenge and her dangerous love life will be introduced.

Cast

Main
 Choi Myung-gil as Jung Mi-ae/Cha Mi-yeon/Carry Jung
 Cha Ye-ryun as Han Yu-jin/Janice

Supporting
 Kim Heung-soo as Goo Hae-jun
  as Hong Se-ra

Viewership 
 In this table,  represent the lowest ratings and  represent the highest ratings.
 N/A denotes that the rating is not known.
The latest episode achieved 2.9 million views nationwide.

Notes

References

External links
  
 
 
 

Korean Broadcasting System television dramas
2019 South Korean television series debuts
2020 South Korean television series endings
Korean-language television shows
Television series about revenge
Television series by IWill Media